The Reckoning is a 1969 British drama film released by Columbia Pictures directed by Jack Gold and starring Nicol Williamson, Ann Bell, Rachel Roberts and Zena Walker. It was based on the 1967 novel The Harp that Once by Patrick Hall and features music by Malcolm Arnold.

The film was shot at Shepperton Studios and on location around London and Liverpool. The film's sets were designed by the art director Ray Simm. Produced during 1969, the film was released on the 8 January the following year.

Plot 
Michael "Mick" Marler has risen through the ranks at a large British company. Despite his polish, Mick comes from a working-class background, and has worked hard to fit into the world in which he and his social-climbing wife Rosemary live. His marriage consists of animalistic lovemaking between traded insults and long silences.

One morning, while Mick is trying to save his boss, Hazlitt, from mistakes and sagging sales, he convinces him to persuade the company to make computers, something they had rejected. After Hazlitt agrees, Rosemary calls to say that Mick's father, John Joe, is dying. Mick wants to leave, but is coerced by Hazlitt into completing a report. Mick remains a tough, but sentimental, Irish Liverpudlian and drives his Jaguar to his childhood neighbourhood.

On entering his father's bedroom, he is shattered to discover that John Joe has died and further disturbed to find dark bruises on his father's face and body. After questioning his mother, his sister, the priest and Dr. Carolan, the family physician, Mick visits the Irish social hall to speak with Cocky Burke, his father's best friend. Cocky says that John Joe, a popular amateur balladeer, had a heart attack after English "Teddy boys" started a fight because he was singing an Irish rebel song, then punched and kicked him. Mick asks Cocky to tell the police, but Cocky, who distrusts the authorities, tells Mick to avenge his father.

Angered by Rosemary's reluctance to attend the funeral, Mick returns to the hall but is spirited away by Joyce, Dr. Carolan's nurse, when police break up a fight. Joyce is unsatisfied by her husband. They go to Mick's old house and make love. In the morning, Joyce has gone but left her address.

Returning to London, Mick and Hazlitt have a successful board meeting, after which Mick goes home and propositions Rosemary. When she instead tells him she is giving a planned party, he angrily goes drinking.

Hours later, Mick stumbles back home, where he makes a scene and punches Sir Miles Bishton, one of his directors. Everyone, including Rosemary, leaves after Mick rants about doing dirty work for English gentlemen. The next day, Hazlitt suspends him and predicts his dismissal when company head Moyle returns from a trip. At home, Rosemary resists Mick's advances, packs and leaves.

Hearing that the magistrate has ruled John Joe's death accidental, Mick again drives to Liverpool. Instead of his mother's, Mick checks into an obscure hotel, then borrows a local company car, parking it near his hotel. Leaving his Jaguar at the hotel entrance, he tells the manager he has a headache and plans to sleep. The manager gives Mick an analgesic and says his car is safe.

After dark, Mick sneaks out to the smaller car and drives to the hall. Soon Jones, the "Teddy" identified as John Joe's attacker, arrives, prompting Mick to savagely beat him with a pipe, despite his pleas for mercy. When Mick checks out in the morning, the manager says that the police asked where he was last night, but she assured them he had been in his room.

Mick drives toward Joyce's address but seeing her with children, drives away. Saying goodbye, his mother tells him the police had been there and softly says "You're a bad lad." Bidding farewell affectionately, Mick says that he always was.

Driving home, Mick thinks of Hilda, Hazlitt's secretary, who likes him. He visits, seduces her and cajoles her into revealing damaging information about Hazlitt. When Moyle summons Mick, Mick appears reluctant to criticise Hazlitt, but then says that Hazlitt had persistently stolen ideas from underlings and blamed them for his errors. Remembering that men Hazlitt has dismissed have been successful elsewhere, Moyle says he is replacing him with Mick. Moyle assumes that Mick will want to keep Hilda, but Mick says she is untrustworthy. During a celebratory drink, Moyle sympathises about Rosemary leaving: when Mick says she will not return, Moyle assures him she will.

Subsequently, as a reconciled Mick and Rosemary are on a motorway, he recklessly speeds past a barrier and narrowly misses hitting an oncoming truck. Exhilarated, Mick says, "If I can get away with that, I can get away with anything."

Cast
 Nicol Williamson as Michael Marler
 Rachel Roberts as Joyce Eglington
 Ann Bell as Rosemary Marler
 Zena Walker as Hilda Greening
 Paul Rogers as John Hazlitt
 Tom Kempinski as Brunzy
 Kenneth Hendel as Davidson
 Douglas Wilmer as Moyle
 Barbara Ewing as Joan
 Gwen Nelson as Michael's Mother
 Christine Hargreaves as Kath
 Ernest C. Jennings as Dad John Joe
 Godfrey Quigley as Dr. Carolan
 Desmond Perry as Father Madden
 J. G. Devlin as Cocky Burke
 Joe Gladwin as Drunk
 Peter Sallis as Keresley
 Jackie Pallo as Wrestler
 Tony Charles as Wrestler
 Christian Rodska as Jones

Production
Filming locations included Seacombe, Wallasey, Birkenhead and the dockland Four Bridges, Liverpool and London. A collection of location stills and corresponding contemporary photographs is hosted at reelstreets.com.

References

Bibliography
 Goble, Alan. The Complete Index to Literary Sources in Film. Walter de Gruyter, 1999.
 Jackson, Paul R.W. The Life and Music of Sir Malcolm Arnold: The Brilliant and the Dark. Routledge, 2019.

1970 drama films
1970 films
British drama films
British films about revenge
Columbia Pictures films
Films about businesspeople
Films based on British novels
Films directed by Jack Gold
Films scored by Malcolm Arnold
Films set in Liverpool
Films set in London
Films shot at Shepperton Studios
Films shot in London
1970s English-language films
1970s British films